Sticky Fingers is a 2009 Canadian film written and directed by Ken Scott.

Plot
Set in 1964, Donald Quintal (Patrice Robitaille) meets Father Padre Carmet (Jorge Sabate) at a missionary but is told by Carmet that he cannot be given the money. Donald begins his story that he was a part of The Panet Street Gang that was made up of six Montreal gangsters, and that four years ago, while they were in prison, they planned a bank heist. When the heist went awry, they all voted to give Jimmy the $2 million from the heist, seeing as he had devoted his life to God, on the condition of promising to share it when they all met again. Jimmy hid under the floor while the other five were taken away. When the five were released from prison, they met at a parish chapel near the Franco-Spanish border. Donald explained to the group that he had received a letter from Jimmy that they were to walk 830 km of the Camino pilgrimage to Santiago to get their share of the money, with a condition, that they needed to prove that they had changed their character as proof of doing the pilgrimage. They learn that they need pilgrim passports to be able to stay at hostels along the way. They tell the Customs women the truth about themselves and they get their passes. Donald Quintal begins a relationship with Maddy (Aure Atika), the girlfriend of Charles (Roy Dupuis) the de facto leader of the group. They arrive in a village and are directed by a boy on his bike to a church and find the grave marker of Jimmy, who had died of his heroin addiction while staying at Carmet's missionary while the others were incarcerated. Cutting back to the conversation between Quintal and Carmet, Quintal is given the money by being given the location of where it is buried. The gang is arrested in Santiago and while the police are going through their bags looking for the money, it is shown that Maddy has it. The members leave prison and get back to their lives. Maddy distributes the money to each member as she sees fit, leaving Charles a plane ticket to come and find her in Venice.

Cast
Patrice Robitaille as Donald Quintal
Jorge Sabate as Father Padre Carmet
Roy Dupuis as Charles Favreau
Aure Atika as Maddy
Gabriel Sabourin as Jimmy
Jean Pierre Bergeron as Isidore
Andrea Bonelli as Passport Agent
Harry Havilio as Old Man
Claude Legault as Conrad
Paolo Noël as Eddy
Donny Quinn as Police officer (as Donny Falsetti)

Reception
The film has a IMDb rating is 6.7/10 with generally positive critic reviews.

References

External links
 

2009 films
2009 crime drama films
Canadian crime drama films
Films directed by Ken Scott
Films shot in Argentina
Films shot in Buenos Aires
Films shot in Montreal
Canadian heist films
2009 directorial debut films
Films set in 1964
French-language Canadian films
2000s Canadian films
Canadian gangster films